Portal Software, Inc., was founded in 1985 as Portal Information Network, one of the first Internet service providers in the San Francisco Bay Area. It was founded by John Little. The company offered its own interface through modem access that featured Internet email. Towards the end of the 1980s, the company offered FTP.

During this time, the company developed its own account management software. In 1992, John Little decided to focus on developing Portal's internal software for other ISPs, which he saw as a fast evolving market. Their ISP business was shut down and the accounts sold to Sprint. The company was renamed Portal Software in 1993 and Dave Labuda joined the new company as co-founder. Little and Labuda developed a scalable and flexible real-time enterprise software architecture, which they applied to the management of customers and revenue for internet and telecom service providers.

Portal Software developed a billing and revenue software suite (Portal Infranet) primarily targeted at telecommunications companies and ISPs. It was one of the largest companies in its business.  Customers of Portal Software included PSINet, AOL Time Warner, China Mobile, Deutsche Telekom, France Télécom, iG Brazil, Juno Online Services, KPN, Orange UK, Reuters, SIRIUS Satellite Radio, Sprint Canada, Telefónica, Telenor, Telstra, TIM, U.S. Cellular, Vodafone, SaskTel and XM Satellite Radio. In order to address the telecommunications market, Portal software acquired the InteGrate software from Solution42, a German company which had a history in high-performance telecommunications Rating. This allowed a realistic performance of rating telephony usage events, something that was not feasible with the 'real-time' rating engine they had developed in-house.

Portal Software was bought by Oracle Corporation in 2006 for an estimated $220 Million. Portal Software is now a business unit of Oracle. Like other acquisition software,  Portal Software will be integrated with the core products of Oracle such as Siebel (CRM), PeopleSoft (ERP/CRM), JD Edwards (ERP). At the time of the acquisition, Dave Labuda was the CEO, Bhaskar Gorti was a Senior Vice President of Worldwide Marketing and Sales, JK Chelladurai was the Managing Director of India development center, Bruce Grainger Vice President of Americas, Tim Porter Vice President of EMEA.

References

Defunct software companies of the United States
Software companies based in the San Francisco Bay Area
Oracle acquisitions
Software companies established in 1985
1985 establishments in California
2006 mergers and acquisitions